Manjit Singh (born 25 January 1986, Punjab) is an Indian football player who plays for Bharat FC in the I-League in India as a striker.

National career
Manjit managed to score 5 goals in 15 games during 2010-11 I-League season with Air India FC.
	Federation Cup runners up with Mahindra United in the year 2007-2008.
	Durand Cup champions with Mahindra United in the year 2008.
	I-League third place runner up with Mahindra United in the year 2006-2007.
	Manjit won IFA Shield twice with Mahindra United.
	Santosh Trophy gold medalist with Punjab 
	He played I league and other major tournaments with Mohan Bagan team.

International career
A small town boy is not nationally famous he has played Internationally also and represented his country across the world
	Manjit has represented Asian Games in Doha/Qatar in the year 2006
	Played SAFF Cup runner up in Sri Lanka and Maldives
	Winner of Nehru Cup 2007
	Represented India national football team for world Cup Football Qualified Round 
	Played AFC Cup with India national football team
	Won India National U-18 Team
	Played all the major tournament with India national football team in India & Abroad.

Honours

India
SAFF Championship runner-up: 2008

References

External links
 
 

1986 births
Living people
Indian footballers
Footballers from Punjab, India
I-League players
JCT FC players
Mohun Bagan AC players
Mahindra United FC players
Salgaocar FC players
Air India FC players
Bhawanipore FC players
India youth international footballers
India international footballers
Association football forwards
Footballers at the 2006 Asian Games
Asian Games competitors for India